Corker Hill is a historic home and farm complex located at Greene Township in Franklin County, Pennsylvania. The manor house was built between 1810 and 1820, and is a two-story, seven bay, brick dwelling on a limestone foundation in the Federal style.  The facade was modified about 1905, to add Colonial Revival style elements, such as a cupola and wraparound porch.  Also on the property are the contributing large stone and frame Pennsylvania bank barn, stone vaulted root cellar, frame shed / chicken coop, frame carriage house / garage, small stone furnace building, wagon shed / corn crib, and frame tenant house (c. 1870).

It was listed on the National Register of Historic Places in 1974.

See also
Frank Thomson

References 

Houses on the National Register of Historic Places in Pennsylvania
Federal architecture in Pennsylvania
Colonial Revival architecture in Pennsylvania
Houses completed in 1820
Houses in Franklin County, Pennsylvania
National Register of Historic Places in Franklin County, Pennsylvania